, known by its operating name Nittobo, is a Tokyo-based company mainly known by its textile and fiberglass products.

Nittobo is listed on the Tokyo Stock Exchange and is a component of the Nikkei 225 stock index.

References

External links
 Official global website 

Manufacturing companies based in Tokyo
Companies listed on the Tokyo Stock Exchange
Chemical companies based in Tokyo
Chemical companies established in 1918
Japanese companies established in 1918